Southwest Georgia Academy is a K–12 private school in Damascus, Georgia. It was established in January 1970 as a segregation academy; the property formerly housed Damascus High School. The founding headmaster was W.T. Henry. According to the National Center for Education Statistics, 266 of 272 students, or 97.8% of the student body were white as of 2018, while 49% of the population of the county was white.

Alumni
 Lea Henry Basketball player and coach.

References

External links
 Southwest Georgia Academy

Private K-12 schools in Georgia (U.S. state)
Schools in Early County, Georgia
Segregation academies in Georgia
1970 establishments in Georgia (U.S. state)
Educational institutions established in 1970